First Presbyterian Church and Cemetery is located at 600 Rahway Avenue in Woodbridge Township, Middlesex County, New Jersey, United States, one of the first townships established in the state at the end of the 17th century.

It congregation was founded in 1675. The property was added to the National Register of Historic Places on May 2, 2008.

Cemetery

The oldest headstone in the cemetery dates from 1690.

See also
Archibald Riddell (minister)
Trinity Episcopal Church – adjacent church, at 650 Rahway Avenue
List of cemeteries in New Jersey

References

External links
 
 

Cemeteries in Middlesex County, New Jersey
Protestant Reformed cemeteries
Churches on the National Register of Historic Places in New Jersey
Neoclassical architecture in New Jersey
Churches in Middlesex County, New Jersey
Presbyterian churches in New Jersey
National Register of Historic Places in Middlesex County, New Jersey
Churches in Woodbridge Township, New Jersey
1675 establishments in New Jersey
New Jersey Register of Historic Places
Neoclassical church buildings in the United States